Henry Ulick Lascelles, 5th Earl of Harewood  (21 August 1846 – 6 October 1929) was a British peer and the son of Henry Lascelles, 4th Earl of Harewood.

Biography
As a child, he lived at Goldsborough Hall in Goldsborough, North Yorkshire, which was the house for the heirs-in-waiting for Harewood House. During his lifetime the Lascelles family were still major landholders in Barbados.

He initially served in the regular army as captain in the Grenadier Guards, after which he served part-time as an officer in the Yorkshire Hussars Yeomanry, which became part of the Territorial Army in 1908. He was lieutenant colonel in command of that regiment from 1881 to 1898 and honorary colonel from 1898 to 1913. His long service with the yeomanry brought him the Territorial Decoration (T.D.) in 1909. He also held the post of colonel and yeomanry aide-de-camp to Queen Victoria from 1897, Edward VII throughout the latter's reign, and to George V from 1910 until his own death.

He succeeded to titles of Earl of Harewood, Viscount Lascelles, and Baron Harewood on 24 June 1892.

He was a Deputy Lieutenant of the West Riding of Yorkshire on 26 February 1900, and Lord Lieutenant of the West Riding of Yorkshire on 4 June 1904, serving as such until 4 December 1927.

In early 1901 Lord Harewood was asked by King Edward to take part in a special diplomatic mission to announce the King's accession to the governments of France, Spain, and Portugal.

In 1908, he was appointed a Knight Commander of the Royal Victorian Order and was appointed a Knight Grand Cross of the Royal Victorian Order in 1922.

Marriage
On 5 November 1881 he married at St Peter's Church, Eaton Square, London, Lady Florence Katharine Bridgeman, daughter of Orlando Bridgeman, 3rd Earl of Bradford, and they had three children:
 Henry George Charles Lascelles, 6th Earl of Harewood (1882–1947), married Princess Mary, the only daughter of King George V and Queen Mary, and aunt of British monarch, Queen Elizabeth II and had issue.
 Lady Margaret Selina Lascelles (1883–1978), married Gustavus Hamilton-Russell, 9th Viscount Boyne and had issue.
 Major Edward Cecil Lascelles (1887–1935), married Joan Balfour, a granddaughter of George Campbell, 8th Duke of Argyll.

Ancestors

References

Work cited

External links
 
 Goldsborough Hall Web site
 Harewood House Web site

1846 births
1929 deaths
Knights Grand Cross of the Royal Victorian Order
Lord-Lieutenants of the West Riding of Yorkshire
Henry
5